Aseem Mishra is Indian cinematographer who has worked in Bollywood films. A few of his films are New York (2009), Ek Tha Tiger (2012), Dabangg 2(2012), Bajrangi Bhaijaan (2015), Phantom (2015), Dream Girl (2019) etc.

He studied cinematography in MCRC, Jamia Millia Islamia. He shot most of Kabir Khan's films, except for Kabul Express.

Filmography

References

External links
 
aseemmishradop on Instagram

Living people
Hindi film cinematographers
Jamia Millia Islamia alumni
Year of birth missing (living people)